An Lộc may refer to several places in Vietnam, including:

An Lộc, Bình Phước, a ward of Bình Long
An Lộc, Đồng Tháp, a ward of Hồng Ngự town
An Lộc, Hà Tĩnh, a commune of Lộc Hà District